Christopher C Ward (born 1941) is a former England international lawn bowler.

Bowls career
He won a bronze medal in the pairs with his younger brother David Ward at the 1986 Commonwealth Games in Edinburgh. He had earlier represented England in the pairs, at the 1978 Commonwealth Games in Edmonton, Alberta, Canada.

In addition he has won four National titles including the singles in 1977 & 1982  and won the singles at the British Isles Bowls Championships in 1983.

Family
In addition to his brother David being an international player his sister Jayne Roylance was an international player and national champion.

References

1941 births
Living people
English male bowls players
Commonwealth Games medallists in lawn bowls
Commonwealth Games bronze medallists for England
Bowls players at the 1978 Commonwealth Games
Bowls players at the 1986 Commonwealth Games
Medallists at the 1986 Commonwealth Games